Senator Kane may refer to:

Elias Kane (1794–1835), U.S. Senator from Illinois
Rob Kane (fl. 2000s–2010s), Connecticut State Senate

See also
Tim Kaine (born 1958), U.S. Senator from Virginia